Surajbhan Singh is an Indian politician and former Member of Parliament. He was born in Bhumihar family. He was elected to the Parliament from Bihar contesting on a ticket from Lok Janshakti Party (LJP). Currently he is debarred from contesting due to conviction in the Brij Behari Prasad murder case.

Personal life
Singh hails from Mokama. His wife, Veena Devi, was an MP from Munger parliamentary constituency on a Lok Janshakti Party.  His son Ashutosh died in a car accident on Greater Noida Expressway on 27 October 2018.

Political career
He started his career in politics by contesting Assembly election against Dilip Singh, the sitting Minister in Government of Bihar and the elder brother of criminal-turned-politician Anant Kumar Singh in 2000 and defeated him by a huge margin. At the time of fighting the 2000 elections, police records credited him with 26 criminal cases ranging across Bihar and Uttar Pradesh. After he was elected an independent MLA from the Mokama Assembly constituency (Patna district) then became MP of Balia, Bihar, on a LJP ticket. Currently he is debarred from contesting due to conviction in the Brij Behari Prasad murder case.

Murder trial 
Singh was alleged to have shot and killed himself, a resident of Madhurapur village in Begusarai district on 16 January 1992. On 24 June 2008,but he was not found guilty by a Bihar court. After that he still went to jail. On Sunday, 10 May 2009 unidentified men shot dead the main witness Nago Singh and his grandson near Barauni in Begusarai.

See also
Ritlal Yadav
Pradeep Mahto
 Anant Kumar Singh
 Vijay Kumar Shukla

References

Indian politicians convicted of crimes
Lok Janshakti Party politicians
Living people
India MPs 2004–2009
Politicians convicted of murder
Criminals from Bihar
People from Begusarai district
People from Patna district
Lok Sabha members from Bihar
1992 murders in India
Year of birth missing (living people)
Bihar MLAs 2000–2005